Alessandro Aimar (born 5 June 1967 in Milan) is a retired Italian sprinter who specialized in the 400 metres.

Biography
He won six medals at the International athletics competitions, all of these with national relays team. His personal best time is 45.76 seconds, achieved in July 1993 in Sestriere. He participated at two editions of the Summer Olympics (1992 and 1996), he has 30 caps in national team from 1989 to 1997.

Achievements

See also
 Italy national relay team

References

External links
 

1967 births
Living people
Italian male sprinters
Athletes (track and field) at the 1992 Summer Olympics
Athletes (track and field) at the 1996 Summer Olympics
Olympic athletes of Italy
Athletes from Milan
Athletics competitors of Fiamme Azzurre
Mediterranean Games gold medalists for Italy
Mediterranean Games silver medalists for Italy
Athletes (track and field) at the 1991 Mediterranean Games
Athletes (track and field) at the 1993 Mediterranean Games
World Athletics Championships athletes for Italy
Mediterranean Games medalists in athletics
World Athletics Indoor Championships medalists